Joaquín Villalobos (born 1951 in San Salvador) is an international authority on security and conflict resolution, and was formerly a Salvadoran guerrilla leader and politician. He is alleged to have been involved in the murder of the Salvadoran poet, Roque Dalton.

Villalobos was one of the main leaders of the People's Revolutionary Army, or Ejército Revolucionario del Pueblo, a group that emerged in El Salvador in the early 1970s as a loose federation of cells with roots in various Marxist and left-wing Catholic groups. The ERP was one of the five organizations that joined together in 1980 to form the Farabundo Martí National Liberation Front during the Salvadoran Civil War, in which left-wing guerrillas fought El Salvador’s military-dominated and US-backed right-wing government.  An economics student and left-wing activist, Villalobos joined the ERP in 1971, at the age of 19. He has since been accused of involvement in the killing in 1975 of Roque Dalton, the revolutionary poet and fellow ERP leader who was shot by his comrades after a power struggle in the group led to accusations that he was a CIA spy. At the time, the killing led to splits and recriminations within the ERP and criticism from other leftists, but after 1980 Villalobos rose to become one of the FMLN’s main military strategists. The ERP under his leadership has been described as “the most efficient military organisation on the Salvadoran left” during the civil war, with Villalobos developing a “reputation for brash strategic brilliance”. The Financial Times described Villalobos as "The true master of 20th-century Latin American guerrilla warfare", above Che Guevara.

He subsequently played a major role in the negotiations that ended the civil war, presenting himself as the conciliatory face of the ERP. In 1992, the year in which the peace agreement was signed, The New York Times described him as a “feared military commander with a reputation for ruthlessness”, but also noted his admission of errors in the rebels’ tactics and his stated regret for many of the killings they had been involved in.

As a result of the 1992 peace accords, the FMLN was legalized as a political party. Villalobos remained a member until 1995, when he and other former leaders of the ERP split from the FMLN to form a new centrist political party, the Democratic Party, which signed a deal with the then government accepting a series of neoliberal reforms.

Villalobos became an outspoken critic of the left in Latin American countries.

In the 1990s, Villalobos went to England to study at St Antony's College, Oxford on a scholarship funded by the British Foreign Office.  He obtained a Master's Degree from St Antony's College and is now a visiting scholar there.

Villalobos has advised various governments and politicians on security and conflict resolution.  He has served as a consultant on peacemaking efforts in countries including Colombia, Mexico, Sri Lanka, Philippines, Afghanistan, Bosnia, and Northern Ireland.   He has also advised the UN, served as an advisor to the Center of Cooperation Initiatives for Development at the University of Alcalá de Henares and as a member of the Inter-American Dialogue in Washington DC, USA. Villalobos has also been asked for his advice with respect to Islamic State.

In 2015, Villalobos was named one of the fifty most influential Ibero-American intellectuals.

In December 2016, Villalobos, along with Jonathan Powell, Bill Ury and Shlomo Ben-Ami,  was awarded a medal by President Juan Manuel Santos of Colombia, in recognition of his contribution to the successful Colombian peace process.

References 

1951 births
Living people
Farabundo Martí National Liberation Front politicians
Members of the Inter-American Dialogue
People from San Salvador
People of the Salvadoran Civil War
Salvadoran communists
Salvadoran rebels